Ventorro del Cano is a station on Line 3 of the Metro Ligero. It is located in fare Zone B1.

References 

Madrid Metro Ligero stations
Alcorcón
Railway stations in Spain opened in 2007